Selena Tranter (née Worsley; born 18 April 1975) is a former Australian rugby union player.

Rugby career

Rugby union career 
Tranter made her test debut for the Wallaroos at 19 on 2 September 1994 against New Zealand in Sydney. She was part of Australia’s first Rugby World Cup squad that competed at the 1998 tournament in the Netherlands. She also captained the Wallaroos in the 2002 and 2006 Rugby World Cup's.

Tranter made her last appearance for the Wallaroos in 2008 against the Black Ferns in Canberra.

Rugby league career 
In 2016, as a 41 year old, she made her State of Origin debut for the Queensland Maroons.

References 

1975 births
Living people
Australian female rugby union players
Australia women's international rugby union players